Nova Vas pri Jelšanah is a small village east of Jelšane in the Municipality of Ilirska Bistrica in the Inner Carniola region of Slovenia, close to the border with Croatia.

Name
The name of the settlement was changed from Nova vas to Nova vas pri Jelšanah in 1953.

Church
The small church in the settlement is dedicated to Saint Vitus and belongs to the Parish of Jelšane.

References

External links
Nova Vas pri Jelšanah on Geopedia

Populated places in the Municipality of Ilirska Bistrica